Stan Lembryk (born August 8, 1969 in Clifton, New Jersey) is an American retired professional soccer player.

Early life 
Lembryk played soccer at Clifton High School under coach, Fernando Rossi.

Coaching 

After retiring from active play, Lembryk has coached in the New York Red Bulls academy.  He currently is the Head Coach of soccer  and school teacher of Special Education at Clifton High School.

Statistics

References

External links 
 Profile on MetroFanatic
 

1969 births
Living people
American soccer players
Clifton High School (New Jersey) alumni
Soccer players from New Jersey
Sportspeople from Clifton, New Jersey
Association football midfielders
Loyola Greyhounds men's soccer players
Loyola University Maryland alumni
New York Red Bulls players
Major League Soccer players